Ryszard Nawrocki (7 March 1940 – 25 April 2011) was a Polish film and stage actor, known for his voice skills and work in the dubbing industry.

Biography
In 1966 he graduated from the Aleksander Zelwerowicz State Theatre Academy. Since 1969 until the death he worked in Polish Theatre in Warsaw. In 1988 he was awarded with Polish Silver Cross of Merit.

As a voice actor he dubbed many characters from animated films, including Rabbit from Winnie-the-Pooh, Cogsworth from Beauty and the Beast, Zazu from The Lion King. Porky Pig and Asterix.

Selected filmography 
 1968: Przygoda z piosenką
 1974: Czterdziestolatek (TV series)
 1974: Wiosna panie sierżancie
 1978: Życie na gorąco
 1988: W labiryncie (TV series)
 1988-1991: Pogranicze w ogniu (TV series)
 1989: Stan strachu
 1995: Uczeń diabła
 2006: Mrok
 2007: Pitbull (TV series)
 2010: Fenomen

References 

Polish male film actors
Polish male stage actors
Polish male voice actors
1940 births
2011 deaths
People from Toruń
Recipients of the Silver Cross of Merit (Poland)